Events in the year 2009 in Guinea-Bissau.

Incumbents
President: 
 until 2 March: João Bernardo Vieira 
 3 March-8 September: Raimundo Pereira 
 starting 8 September: Malam Bacai Sanhá
Prime Minister: Carlos Correia (until 2 January), Carlos Gomes Júnior (starting 2 January)

Events
June 28 and July 26 - Guinea-Bissau presidential election, 2009

Arts and entertainment

Sports
Guinea-Bissau was at the Lusophony Games: Guinea-Bissau at the 2009 Lusophony Games.

Deaths
March 1 - Batista Tagme Na Waie, Army chief of staff
March 2 - João Bernardo Vieira, President of Guinea-Bissau
May 30 - Luís Cabral, former President of Guinea-Bissau

References

 
Guinea-Bissau
Guinea-Bissau
Years of the 21st century in Guinea-Bissau
2000s in Guinea-Bissau